Antarvedipalem, or Antarvedi, is a village in Konaseema district in the state of Andhra Pradesh in India.

Geography
It is located on the west face of the Bay of Bengal.

Demographics
As of Census 2011, Antarvedipalem has a population of 14,162 of which 7,018 were males while 7,144 were females, sex ratio is 1018. Population of children (age 0-6) was 1,118 which makes up 7.89% of total population of village. Literacy rate of the village was 87.03%.

References 

Villages in East Godavari district